The name Banyan has been used to name four tropical cyclones in the Western North Pacific Ocean. The name was contributed by Hong Kong and refers to Ficus microcarpa, a type of tree commonly seen in Southeast China.

 Tropical Storm Banyan (2005) (T0507, 07W) – struck Japan
 Tropical Storm Banyan (2011) (T1120, 23W, Ramon) – struck the Philippines
 Typhoon Banyan (2017) (T1712, 14W) – a strong typhoon that remained out at sea
 Tropical Storm Banyan (2022) (T2223, 27W, Queenie) – remained out at sea

Pacific typhoon set index articles